Antoine-Chrysostome Quatremère de Quincy (21 October 1755 – 28 December 1849) was a French armchair archaeologist and architectural theorist, a Freemason, and an effective arts administrator and influential writer on art.

Life
Born in Paris, Quatremère de Quincy trained for the law, then followed courses in art and history at the Collège Louis-le-Grand and apprenticed for a time in the atelier of Guillaume Coustou the Younger and Pierre Julien, getting some practical experience in the art of sculpture. A trip to Naples in the company of Jacques-Louis David sparked his interest in Greek and Roman architecture.

He was involved in the troubles of the French Revolution. He was a royalist in the National Legislative Assembly of 1791–1792, and his politics were monarchist and Catholic. As a member of the Revolutionary Committee of Public Instruction his set of three Considerations on the arts of design in France was offered before the Assemblée Nationale at a time (1791) when the continuation of the former academies was under question; he offered a program for their reform. in part by opening up the Paris salons. In 1791–1792 he orchestrated the conversion of the Church of Ste-Geneviève in Paris (under the direction of Jean-Baptiste Rondelet) into the Panthéon, infilling the windows to give it the character of a mausoleum.  In 1795 he was accused of taking part in the preparations for the royalist insurrection of 13 Vendémiaire and condemned to death, but subsequently acquitted.

In July 1796, he wrote a pseudo-epistolary treatise against the French plans to seize works of art from Rome, arguing that European powers should instead contribute a sum to the papacy for protecting art and knowledge. Shortly afterward, he was behind a petition signed by forty-seven Parisian artists including Jacques-Louis David which questioned the benefits of displacing art from Rome; although prudently worded, there was a vituperative official response.

In the same year he was elected to the Council of Five Hundred for the Seine department, then went into hiding after taking part in a royalist coup. While in exile in Germany, he read Immanuel Kant and Gotthold Lessing, whose philosophy informed his own theories of aesthetics. In 1800, back in Paris, he was appointed secretary general of the Seine council. From 1816 until 1839 he was perpetual secretary to the Académie des Beaux-Arts, which gave him great influence upon official architecture, and in 1818 he became a professor of archaeology at the Bibliothèque Nationale. He briefly returned to politics in 1820. In 1826 he became an associated member of the Royal Institute of the Netherlands.

Quatremère de Quincy was the author of numerous articles and books. From 1788 to 1825, he wrote the three Architecture volumes of the Encyclopédie Méthodique. His Dictionnaire historique de l'Architecture was published in 1832–1833. He wrote biographies of several artists: Antonio Canova (1823), Raphael (1824) and Michelangelo (1835).

He transformed the simple metaphor of architecture as language into a framework for reconceptualizing the structure of architecture; modern writers describing "vernacular" architecture, or the Baroque "idiom" or the "vocabulary" of Classicism owe a debt to Quatremère de Quincy.

His essay De l'Architecture Égyptienne, written for a competition posed by the Académie des Inscriptions et Belles-Lettres in 1785 and published in 1803, just as the Description de l'Egypte was in preparation, nevertheless was an important influence on the Egyptian Revival phase of Neoclassical architecture, for its theoretical observations concerning the origins of architecture rather than for its historical naiveté. He was among the first to point out the use of polychromy in Greek sculpture and architecture. Though he insisted that landscape gardening could not be admitted among the fine arts, he was a key figure in the establishment of the first landscaped cemeteries, and his essay, translated into English as The Nature, the End and the Means of Imitation in the Fine Arts influenced J. C. Loudon.

Notes

Sources

French art historians
1755 births
1849 deaths
Architectural theoreticians
French male non-fiction writers
Members of the Royal Netherlands Academy of Arts and Sciences